In geometry, the medial rhombic triacontahedron (or midly rhombic triacontahedron) is a nonconvex isohedral polyhedron. It is a stellation of the rhombic triacontahedron, and can also be called small stellated triacontahedron. Its dual is the dodecadodecahedron.

Its 24 vertices are all on the 12 axes with 5-fold symmetry (i.e. each corresponds to one of the 12 vertices of the icosahedron). This means that on each axis there is an inner and an outer vertex.

It has 30 intersecting rhombic faces, which correspond to the faces of the convex rhombic triacontahedron.

This solid is to the compound of small stellated dodecahedron and great dodecahedron what the convex one is to the compound of dodecahedron and icosahedron:
The crossing edges in the dual compound are the diagonals of the rhombs.
Its dihedral angles equal . Part of each rhomb lies inside the solid, hence is invisible in solid models.

Related hyperbolic tiling
It is topologically equivalent to a quotient space of the hyperbolic order-5 square tiling, by distorting the rhombi into squares. As such, it is topologically a regular polyhedron of index two:

Note that the order-5 square tiling is dual to the order-4 pentagonal tiling, and a quotient space of the order-4 pentagonal tiling is topologically equivalent to the dual of the medial rhombic triacontahedron, the dodecadodecahedron.

See also 
 Great rhombic triacontahedron
 Great triambic icosahedron

References

External links 
 
 David I. McCooey: animation and measurements
 Uniform polyhedra and duals

Dual uniform polyhedra